Fischhaber is a German surname. Notable people with the surname include:

 Simon Fischhaber (born 1990), German ice hockey player
  (born 1940), German racing driver

German-language surnames